Nettapakkam is a Village, Commune and Assembly Constituency in the Union Territory of Puducherry, India. It consists of Nettapakkam Enclave and Embalam part of Nettapakkam Commune in the main Enclave of Puducherry.  It forms a part of western border to the Union territory.

History
Nettapakkam played a vital role in the merger of Puducherrry UT with India Union. It was at the Nettapakkam police station that the Tricolour was hoisted for the first time on 31 March 1954, by Socialist party leaders in favour of a merger with the Indian Union. Also an ancient Shiva temple exists here. The original name of Nettapakkam was Nedumpakkam, then as time passed it changed into Nettapakkam.

Demographics
 India census, Nettapakkam had a population of 25,503. Males constitute 50% of the population and females 50%. Nettapakkam has an average literacy rate of 81.49%, male literacy is 88.89%, and female literacy is 74.13%. In Nettapakkam, 10% of the population is under 6 years of age.

Geography
Nettapakkam is 25 km. from Puducherry city. It is connected with Puducherry by Puducherry-Madukkarai Bus route.

Road Network
Two RC Roads passes through Nettapakkam. They are

 Frontier Road (RC-21)
 Mangalam - Madukkarai Road (RC-19)

In fact Nettapakkam is located at the junction of RC-19 and RC-21

The roads in Nettapakkam leads to places such as,
 Madukarai
 Pakkam X Road
 Madagadipet

Place of interest

Ramalingeshwar temple

Ramalingeshwar temple is located in the heart of Nettapakkam. This temple belongs to Chola period. In this temple  a Special festival know as Kandarsashti thiruvizha along with soora samharam is celebrated every year for lord Selva Muthukumarasamy by the village people. Also car festival is celebrated for lord Shiva.

Schools
Nettapakkam has two government schools, one for primary and another for higher secondary (VI–XII) as government primary school and Kamban government higher secondary school.

Hospital
Nettapakkam has its own government health care centre.

Puducherry Western Entrance, Madukkarai
An entrance arch is built at Madukkarai on Siruvandadu Road. The pillar in the arch displays the Freedom fighter's name, who fought for the merger of Puducherry UT with the Indian Union.

The Nettapakkam commune has two specialized arch walls with Lion's covering the world (globe), it can be found on Nettapakkam entrance and also in kalmandapam entrance.

References

External links
Official website of the Government of the Union Territory of Puducherry

Villages in Puducherry district